Sean Armand  (born August 26, 1991) is an American professional basketball player who plays for Al Ittihad Alexandria of the Egyptian Basketball Super League. He played college basketball at Iona College in New York state.

Professional career
On July 31, 2017, Armand signed a one-year deal with the Turkish team Gaziantep Basketbol. In 44 games played during the 2017–18 season, he averaged 15 points, 3.4 rebounds, 4.7 assists

On July 23, 2018, Armand signed with the Russian team Zenit Saint Petersburg for the 2018–19 season.

On August 4, 2019, he has signed with Bahçeşehir Koleji of the Basketbol Süper Ligi (BSL).

On January 16, 2020, he has signed with Élan Chalon of the LNB Pro A. On August 21, 2020, he has signed with Maccabi Rishon LeZion of the Israeli Premier League. Armand was released on September 21. He re-signed with Elan Chalon on October 1. He averaged 16.8 points, 4.6 assists, 3.4 rebounds and 1.0 steals per game. On August 16, 2021, Armand signed with Fuenlabrada of the Spanish Liga ACB. He averaged 11 points, 2.6 assists, 2.4 rebounds, and 1.3 steals per game.

On December 1, Armand signed with Petkim Spor of the Turkish Basketball Super League.

On August 23, 2022, Armand joined Al Ittihad Alexandria of the Egyptian Basketball Super League.

The Basketball Tournament
Sean Arman played for Gael Nation in the 2018 edition of The Basketball Tournament. In 2 games, he averaged 22 points, 3.5 assists, and 3 steals per game. Gael Nation reached the second round before falling to Armored Athlete.

References

External links
Iona bio
RealGM profile

1991 births
Living people
American expatriate basketball people in France
American expatriate basketball people in Germany
American expatriate basketball people in Russia
American expatriate basketball people in Spain
American expatriate basketball people in Turkey
American men's basketball players
Bahçeşehir Koleji S.K. players
Baloncesto Fuenlabrada players
Basketball players from New York City
BC Zenit Saint Petersburg players
Gaziantep Basketbol players
Iona Gaels men's basketball players
İstanbul Büyükşehir Belediyespor basketball players
Petkim Spor players
Shooting guards
Skyliners Frankfurt players
Sportspeople from Brooklyn
Al Ittihad Alexandria Club basketball players